Pähklisaar Nature Reserve is a nature reserve which is located in Tartu County, Estonia.

The area of the nature reserve is 770 ha.

The protected area was founded in 1964 to protect Pähklisaar (:et) and its surrounding areas. Before 1999, the protected area was designated as a Pähklisaar Landscape Conservation Area. In 1999 the nature reserve was formed.

References

Nature reserves in Estonia
Geography of Tartu County